Li Jiawei (born 9 August 1981) is a retired Chinese-born former Singaporean table tennis player, four-time Olympian and twice Olympic medalist. She trained in Beijing's famous Shichahai Sports School with Olympic medalist Zhang Yining. In 1995, she moved to Singapore and in the following year, she commenced her international career as a competitive table tennis player. She became a Singapore citizen at the age of 18 years under the Foreign Sports Talent Scheme.

Li's highest world singles ranking was in December 2005, when she was placed third. Li was also a key player for the Singaporean women's team and doubles, and mixed doubles events, having participated in three Olympics and achieving a medal for the latter two. She finished in fourth place in singles at both the 2004 Summer Olympics in Athens and the 2008 Summer Olympics in Beijing at which she was an official flagbearer. On 15 August 2008, the Singapore women's team composed of Li and her teammates Feng Tianwei and Wang Yuegu defeated South Korea 3–2 in the semifinals. However, in the finals on 17 August, the team lost to China and earned a silver medal, marking the first time that Singapore had won an Olympic medal since the nation's independence in 1965. The momentous occasion came 48 years after Tan Howe Liang won the country's first medal, a silver in weightlifting at the 1960 Summer Olympics in Rome. Li ended 2008 on a high, winning gold in the women's team event with Feng and Wang at the ITTF Pro Tour ERKE German Open in Berlin in November, and in the doubles with Sun Beibei at the ITTF Volkswagen Pro Tour Grand Finals in Macau in December 2008.

Li won the women's team bronze medal with Feng and Wang at the 2012 Summer Olympics in London. Soon after, she announced her retirement from competitive sports on 27 December 2012.

Early years
Li was born on 9 August 1981 in Beijing, People's Republic of China, only daughter of a government official and a housewife. In 1990, Li was a student at the Beijing Shichahai Sports School. In 1994, she entered the Beijing provincial team and her skills in table tennis were recognised by Singaporean talent scouts. In 1996, she was invited to train in Singapore under the Foreign Sports Talent Scheme, only returning to China once a year to visit her parents. She began representing Singapore internationally in competitive table tennis the following year. At 18, she became a Singapore citizen.

Professional career
Ranked 18th in the world in 2000, Li achieved gold medals in the women's team, women's doubles and mixed doubles events at the XVII Commonwealth Games held between 25 July and 4 August 2002 in Manchester, and was ranked eighth in November 2002. The following year, in December 2003, Li was a member of the Singapore team which swept the top awards at the 23rd Southeast Asian Games in the women's team, women's singles, women's doubles and mixed doubles.

On 3 July 2004, Li took gold in the women's singles at the International Table Tennis Federation (ITTF) Pro Tour US Open in Chicago. Subsequently, at the 2004 Summer Olympics in Athens, she defeated the second-seeded China player Wang Nan but eventually finished in fourth place. In 2005, she was second in the ITTF Pro Tour Grand Finals, and gained silver medals for the women's singles and mixed doubles at the 23rd Southeast Asian (SEA) Games held between 28 November and 4 December 2005 in Manila. She was also the key player in the gold-winning women's team and women's doubles events. In December 2005, she was ranked third in the world as a singles player. She won an individual Singapore Youth Award in 2005 and was Her World magazine's Young Woman Achiever of 2005.

At the 2006 Commonwealth Games in Melbourne, Li won gold for the women's team and women's doubles, and the silver medal for the women's singles and mixed doubles events. Subsequently, she won the women's singles at the ITTF Pro Tour Russia Open. She also achieved third place in the ITTF Pro Tour Grand Finals and the Women's World Cup, which are two of the most prestigious and difficult competitions in the table tennis arena. At the 15th Asian Games held from 29 November to 7 December 2006 in Doha, Qatar, she achieved three medals: a silver for the women's team event and two bronzes for the women's singles and mixed doubles. The next year, she won gold in the singles at the ITTF Pro Tour Chinese Taipei Open in Taipei, and helped Singapore to the top spots in the women's team and mixed doubles events at the 2007 SEA Games in Nakhon Ratchasima (Korat), Thailand.

As at August 2008, Li was ranked sixth in the world. She won the accolade of Sportswoman of the Year from the Singapore National Olympic Council five times in a row between 2002 and 2006, and received a Meritorious Award in 2007.

At the club competition level, Li played in the Chinese Table Tennis Super League. In 2008, she represented Peking University club, and in 2010, she played for Beijing Holdings, a team including world champion Ding Ning.

2008 Summer Olympics
Li represented Singapore for the third time in the Olympic Games at the 2008 Summer Olympics in Beijing. She was the flag-bearer for Team Singapore at the opening ceremony of the Games on 8 August, having requested the honour. She explained: "There has been so much debate over the foreign talent scheme. This is my way of showing everyone that everything I've ever achieved is because of Singapore."

At the Beijing Olympics, on 13 August 2008, the Singapore women's table tennis team, coached by Liu Guodong and with Li as the team captain leading teammates Feng Tianwei and Wang Yuegu, beat teams from the United States and Nigeria with comfortable 3–0 wins. On 14 August, the Singapore team also defeated the Netherlands 3–0 to reach the semifinals, but not before a gruelling five-game doubles match against the Dutch players Li Jie and Elena Timina which Li Jiawei and Wang Yuegu eventually won 3–2. The next day, 15 August, the Singapore team defeated the South Korean team of Dang Ye-Seo, Kim Kyung-Ah and Park Mi-Young 3–2 in the semifinals, which went to five matches. Li lost her singles match to Korea's Kim, but beat Kim and Park in the doubles with her partner Wang. Singapore's Feng won both her singles matches against Dang and Park.

On 17 August, Li and her teammates gained Singapore a silver medal in women's table tennis after losing to China in three matches. Li won the first game of her singles match, but was then defeated by her former Beijing Sports School teammate Zhang Yining. In the doubles match, China's Zhang and Guo Yue bested Singapore's Li and Wang Yuegu. This marked the first time that Singapore had won an Olympic medal since the nation's independence in 1965. The medal came 48 years after Tan Howe Liang won the country's first medal, a silver in weightlifting in the lightweight category at the 1960 Summer Olympics in Rome. Prime Minister Lee Hsien Loong requested that the live English-language broadcast of his National Day Rally speech, which coincided with the table tennis finals, be postponed by a day. He also provided the audience with updates on the score, and made a conference call to Tan Eng Liang, Team Singapore's chef de mission, to congratulate the team.

Li and her teammates received byes into the third round of the singles tournament. She beat Croatia's Tamara Boroš in the third round, Hong Kong's Lin Ling in the fourth round, and the USA's Wang Chen in the quarter-finals. However, on 22 August she was defeated in the semifinals 4–1 by Zhang Yining of China, ranked number one in the world, and lost the bronze medal 4–2 to China's Guo Yue. Thus placed fourth in the singles tournament, she equalled her performance in the 2004 Athens Olympics but again failed in her quest for an individual Olympic medal. After the bronze medal match, a tearful Li told reporters this would be her final Olympics. At a victory celebration in Singapore on 25 August, Vivian Balakrishnan, the Minister for Community Development, Youth and Sports, announced that Li, Feng and Wang would be presented with the Pingat Jasa Gemilang (Meritorious Service Medal), only the third time the medal would be awarded to athletes, the two previous recipients being weightlifter Tan Howe Liang (1962) and swimmer Joscelin Yeo (2006).

Li has expressed interest in pursuing a communications degree at Peking University. In October 2008 the Singapore Table Tennis Association said the Association and the Singapore Sports Council were prepared to offer her a scholarship to do so. Nevertheless, Li said that she wished to continue her career and to compete in the 2012 Summer Olympics.

In May 2009, the national table tennis women's team, composed of Li and her teammates Feng, Wang and Sun Beibei, were awarded the Team of the Year (Event) prize at the Singapore Sports Awards.

2008–2012 
On 22 November 2008, despite crashing out of the singles event earlier, Li and her teammates Feng and Wang won the top title and US$8,000 at the ITTF Pro Tour ERKE German Open in Berlin. Li ended the year as top seed with Sun Beibei, achieving gold in the women's doubles at the ITTF Volkswagen Pro Tour Grand Finals in Macau on 14 December 2008, the first time that Singapore had won this event. They beat South Koreans Kim Kyung Ah and Park Mi-Young 11–5, 6–11, 11–9, 11–8, 11–4. Li was named Today newspaper's Singapore Athlete of the Year 2008.

Li returned to the international stage in February 2010 after taking a year off from competitive table tennis to give birth to a child. Her first major competition – the World Team Table Tennis Championships in Moscow – saw her and her teammates beating China in the finals to clinch gold. Li also had a series of good performances after her return. She guided the women's team to gold at the 2010 Commonwealth Games in New Delhi and went on to win the women's doubles title with Sun Beibei. She ended 2010 with winning the silver medal in the women's team event of the 16th Asian Games.

2012 Summer Olympics
Li represented Singapore at the 2012 Summer Olympics in London. She participated in the women's team competition with Feng and Wang. They were beaten 0–3 by Japan in the semifinals, but took the bronze medal on 7 August 2012 by edging South Korea out 3–0. Feng defeated Kim Kyung Ah 11–9, 11–8, 4–11, 13–11; and Li also successfully fended off Seok Ha Jung 11–5, 11–8, 6–11, 11–8. Li and Wang then succeeded in the doubles game against Seok and Dang Ye Seo 11–9, 11–6, 6–11, 11–5. This marked the first time Singapore had won more than one medal at an Olympic Games.

Retirement
Li announced her retirement from competitive sports on 27 December 2012. Although she planned to relocate to Beijing with her husband and son, she said she hoped to continue her involvement with table tennis in Singapore. The Singapore Table Tennis Association was said to be helping Li find employment in a Singapore company with operations based in China.

Medals

Personal life
Li first met Singaporean badminton player and fellow Olympian Ronald Susilo in 2002 at a sports meet. They began dating after participating together in the Athens Olympics, and the "golden sports couple", as they were dubbed by the media, announced their engagement in September 2004. They divorced in 2008.

On 26 September 2008, Li registered a marriage in Beijing with Li Chao, a businessman based in that city; they were introduced by a mutual friend in March 2008. Sources quoted by The Straits Times said Li had long wanted her children to bear her surname. A lavish wedding banquet was held at the Beijing Hotel on 25 April 2009. On 13 October 2009, she and her husband had their first child, a boy weighing .

See also
Singapore at the 2008 Summer Olympics
Singapore at the 2012 Summer Olympics
Table tennis at the 2008 Summer Olympics
Table tennis at the 2012 Summer Olympics

Notes

References

.
.
.

External links
 

Official website of the Singapore National Olympic Council
Official website of the Singapore Table Tennis Association
Official website of Team Singapore, managed by the Singapore Sports Council

 
 
 

1981 births
Living people
Table tennis players from Beijing
Chinese emigrants to Singapore
Singaporean sportspeople of Chinese descent
Naturalised citizens of Singapore
Naturalised table tennis players
Chinese female table tennis players
Singaporean female table tennis players
Commonwealth Games bronze medallists for Singapore
Commonwealth Games gold medallists for Singapore
Commonwealth Games silver medallists for Singapore
Asian Games medalists in table tennis
Olympic bronze medalists for Singapore
Olympic medalists in table tennis
Olympic silver medalists for Singapore
Olympic table tennis players of Singapore
Recipients of the Pingat Jasa Gemilang
Table tennis players at the 2002 Commonwealth Games
Table tennis players at the 2006 Commonwealth Games
Table tennis players at the 2010 Commonwealth Games
Table tennis players at the 2000 Summer Olympics
Table tennis players at the 2004 Summer Olympics
Table tennis players at the 2008 Summer Olympics
Table tennis players at the 2012 Summer Olympics
Medalists at the 2012 Summer Olympics
Medalists at the 2008 Summer Olympics
Table tennis players at the 2002 Asian Games
Table tennis players at the 2006 Asian Games
Table tennis players at the 2010 Asian Games
Medalists at the 2002 Asian Games
Medalists at the 2006 Asian Games
Medalists at the 2010 Asian Games
Asian Games silver medalists for Singapore
Asian Games bronze medalists for Singapore
Commonwealth Games medallists in table tennis
Southeast Asian Games gold medalists for Singapore
Southeast Asian Games silver medalists for Singapore
Southeast Asian Games bronze medalists for Singapore
Southeast Asian Games medalists in table tennis
World Table Tennis Championships medalists
Competitors at the 2003 Southeast Asian Games
Medallists at the 2002 Commonwealth Games